Real Zaragoza, S.A.D., commonly referred to as Zaragoza, is a football club based in Zaragoza, Aragon, Spain, that currently competes in the Segunda División, the second tier of the Spanish league system. Zaragoza holds its home games at La Romareda.

Founded on 18 March 1932, the club has spent the majority of its history in La Liga, although they have not played at that level since they were last relegated in 2013. They have won the Copa del Rey six times, 1963–64 Inter-Cities Fairs Cup and the 1994–95 UEFA Cup Winners' Cup, amongst other trophies. Traditionally, their team colours are white shirts and socks with royal blue shorts.

A government survey in 2007 found that 2.7% of the Spanish population support Real Zaragoza, making them the seventh-most supported in the country.

The club's main rivals are: SD Huesca, their opponents in the Aragonese derby; CD Numancia, from the nearby Province of Soria; and CA Osasuna, the largest club in the neighbouring Navarre region.

History

Early years
Real Zaragoza was originally formed from two rival teams: Iberia SC and Real Zaragoza CD. In 1939, after three years without football due to the Spanish Civil War, the team made its first appearance in La Liga, ending in 7th position out of 12 teams, but being relegated in 1941. The club returned to the top division one year later, only to be immediately relegated back. It remained in Segunda División until the end of the 1950–51 campaign, when it achieved promotion by finishing second in a play-off league.

On 8 September 1957, the team left its original stadium, El Torrero, for its current stadium, La Romareda.

The golden era
Beginning in the 1960–61 season, Zaragoza enjoyed a period of great success, showcasing some of the greatest players playing in Spain during that decade, which earned for themselves the designation of Los Magníficos. While the team failed to capture the league title, it finished in the top five every year until 1968–69, with two third-place finishes, and also won its first two Copa del Rey titles and the 1963–64 Inter-Cities Fairs Cup.

Zaragoza's famous attacking line included Canário, Carlos Lapetra, Marcelino, Eleuterio Santos and Juan Manuel Villa. The Peruvian Juan Seminario, who started his career in Spain with Los Maños before moving to Barcelona, won the Pichichi Trophy in the 1961–62 campaign, scoring 25 goals in 30 matches as Zaragoza finished in fourth position.

1970s to the end of the century

Zaragoza finished third in 1973–74 and a best-ever second in the following season, losing the title in the last round to Real Madrid. The club was also defeated 0–1 in the 1976 domestic cup final against Atlético Madrid, spending two seasons in the second level during the decade, with promotion at the first attempt on either occasion.

In 1986, Zaragoza won its third Copa del Rey, defeating Barcelona 1–0. The club finished the 1990–91 season in 17th position, thus having to appear in the promotion/relegation play-offs against Real Murcia; on 19 June 1991, after a 0–0 away draw, a 5–2 home win meant the team managed to maintain its top level status.

Víctor Fernández was appointed manager in 1991. On 10 May 1995, one year after winning the Copa del Rey against Celta de Vigo, Zaragoza won the UEFA Cup Winners' Cup against Arsenal at the Parc des Princes, Paris, after having disposed of the likes of Feyenoord and Chelsea en route. With the score level at 1–1, the two teams entered extra time and, in the 120th minute, Nayim hit a half-volley from just past the halfway line, putting it beyond the reach of goalkeeper David Seaman for the final 2–1. The club then contested the 1995 UEFA Super Cup against Ajax, losing 1–5 on aggregate despite a home draw in the first leg. Víctor Fernández was dismissed from his post in early November 1996, after only winning one league match that season.

The 21st century

The 2000s brought a further two Copa del Rey titles to Zaragoza's trophy cabinet, including the 2003–04 edition against Real Madrid in Barcelona (3–2 after extra time). However, the club also suffered top flight relegation in 2002 after narrowly avoiding so the previous season, but achieved immediate promotion in 2003. In late May 2006, Agapito Iglesias purchased Alfonso Solans' shares and took control of the club, promising to build one of the strongest teams in Spain and Europe. In his first year in charge, he purchased Pablo Aimar from Valencia for €11 million, and former manager Víctor Fernández also returned to the club.

Mainly due to Diego Milito's 23 goals in 2006–07 (he finished third to Roma's Francesco Totti and Real Madrid's Ruud van Nistelrooy – 26 and 25 goals, respectively – in the European Golden Shoe race), Real Zaragoza finished in sixth position, thus qualifying to the UEFA Cup. However, the following season ended in relegation (18th position among 20 teams with only 10 wins in 38 matches, among them only 1 away win in 19 games) – for the second time in the decade – with the side also being eliminated in the first round in European competition. Legendary club coach Víctor Fernández returned for a second spell, although he was sacked in January 2008, as the club had four managers during the campaign. On the last matchday, a brace from Ricardo Oliveira proved insufficient in a 2–3 away loss against Mallorca, with the team totalling 42 points to Osasuna's 43.

Zaragoza achieved promotion from the second division at the first attempt. On the last matchday, on 20 June 2009, the team drew 2–2 at Rayo Vallecano with goals from youth graduate David Generelo and ex-Real Madrid defender Francisco Pavón, only trailing champions Xerez in the table. Nevertheless, that season Zaragoza was the best team at home, gained 50 from their 81 points in home games. However, after four seasons mainly spent in the bottom half of the table, Zaragoza was relegated following the 2012–13 Liga season after finishing last.

In April 2022, the purchase of 51% of the shares of the SAD by an international investment fund led by Jorge Mas was disclosed.

Seasons

Season to season

58 seasons in La Liga
26 seasons in Segunda División
4 seasons in Tercera División

Current squad

Reserve team

Out on loan

Current technical staff

Honours

Domestic

League
 Segunda División
 Winners: 1977–78

Cups
 Copa del Rey
 Winners: 1963–64, 1965–66, 1985–86, 1993–94, 2000–01, 2003–04
 Supercopa de España
 Winners:  2004

International
 UEFA Cup Winners' Cup
 Winners: 1994–95
 Inter-Cities Fairs Cup
 Winners: 1963–64

Records

Club
Best La Liga position: 2nd (1974–75)
Worst La Liga position: 20th (2001–02)
Overall La Liga historical classification: 9th
Greatest home win: Real Zaragoza 8–1 Español (1978–79), Real Zaragoza 8–1 Sevilla (1987–88)
Greatest away win: Elche 2–7 Real Zaragoza (1960–61)
Greatest home defeat: Real Zaragoza 1–7 Real Madrid (1987–88)
Greatest away defeat: Athletic Bilbao 10–1 Real Zaragoza (1951–52)

Player
Most matches: Xavier Aguado (473)
Most minutes: Xavier Aguado (33,480)
Most goals all-time: Marcelino (117)
Most goals in one season: Ewerthon (28, 2008–09)
Foreign player with most appearances: Gustavo Poyet (239)
Red cards: Xavier Aguado (18)

Notable players

Note: this list includes players that have appeared in at least 100 league games and/or have reached international status.

Coaches

See also 
 List of football clubs in Spain

References

External links

 Official website 
 Real Zaragoza at La Liga 
 Real Zaragoza at UEFA 

 
Football clubs in Aragon
Sport in Zaragoza
Copa del Rey winners
Z
Association football clubs established in 1932
1932 establishments in Spain
Segunda División clubs
UEFA Cup Winners' Cup winning clubs
Z
La Liga clubs